Albert Lee Stephens Jr. (February 19, 1913 – September 6, 2001) was a United States district judge of the United States District Court for the Southern District of California and the United States District Court for the Central District of California.

Education and career

Born February 19, 1913, in Los Angeles, California, the son of United States Circuit Judge Albert Lee Stephens Sr. and brother of California Court of Appeal Associate Justice Clarke E. Stephens, Stephens received an Artium Baccalaureus degree in 1936 from the University of Southern California and a Bachelor of Laws in 1938 from the USC Gould School of Law. He entered private practice in Los Angeles from 1939 to 1943. He was a United States Naval Reserve lieutenant from 1943 to 1946. He returned to private practice in Los Angeles from 1946 to 1959. He was appointed by Governor Pat Brown as Judge of the Los Angeles County Superior Court, serving from 1959 to 1961.

Federal judicial service

Stephens was nominated by President John F. Kennedy on August 28, 1961, to a seat on the United States District Court for the Southern District of California vacated by Judge Benjamin Harrison. He was confirmed by the United States Senate on September 8, 1961, and received his commission on September 18, 1961. He was reassigned by operation of law to the United States District Court for the Central District of California on September 18, 1966, to a new seat authorized by 80 Stat. 75. He served as Chief Judge from 1970 to 1979. He assumed senior status on June 1, 1979. His service terminated on September 6, 2001, due to his death of heart failure in Mammoth Lakes, California, while on a fishing trip with former clerk and other friends.

Notable cases

Stephens supervised the large number of cases that arose from the 1969 Santa Barbara oil spill.

References

Sources

External links
 

1913 births
2001 deaths
University of Southern California alumni
Judges of the United States District Court for the Southern District of California
Judges of the United States District Court for the Central District of California
United States district court judges appointed by John F. Kennedy
20th-century American judges
United States Navy officers
USC Gould School of Law alumni